Milanów may refer to the following places:
 Milanów, Lublin Voivodeship (east Poland)
 Milanów, Garwolin County in Masovian Voivodeship (east-central Poland)
 Milanów, Grójec County in Masovian Voivodeship (east-central Poland)
 Gmina Milanów (east Poland)